The Tempelfjorden Group is a geologic group in Norway. It preserves fossils dating back to the Late Permian period.

See also 
 List of fossiliferous stratigraphic units in Norway

References 

Geologic groups of Europe
Geologic formations of Norway
Permian System of Europe
Permian Norway
Geology of Svalbard